Dayawati Modi (1915–1994) was the wife of the founder of Modi Enterprises, Rai Bahadur Gujarmal Modi. People she helped due to her altruistic nature colloquially referred to her as Maji as a sign of respect and gratitude. Her contribution towards the development of society in Modinagar and elsewhere was underlined by her dedication towards uplifting the underprivileged and providing educational opportunities to women and children. She is the grandmother of Lalit Modi, the founder of the Indian Premier League (IPL).

Personal life

Dayawati Modi was born in Kasganj—a small town in Uttar Pradesh. Daughter of Chheda Lal, Dayawati lost her mother at the age of three. Although not formally educated, Dayawati Modi had a penchant for literature, which led to her reading many books stored in her uncle's attic. This was the beginning of her long and fulfilling tryst with philanthropy in the education sector. On 19 June 1932, Dayawati Modi married Gujarmal Modi at the age of seventeen. This was Gujarmal Modi's second marriage, after his first wife died due a prolonged illness. Dayawati lived with her father initially, as Gujarmal set about establishing his business in erstwhile Begumabad. Thereafter, the couple had eleven children— five boys and six girls. Children are K.K Modi, V.K Modi, S.K Modi, B.K Modi (Dr. M), U.K Modi. 
Deeply religious, Dayawati Modi was bestowed with various awards in recognition of her societal contributions.

Awards and recognition

  1982– Shiromani Award for Sikh Studies
  1983–  Kala Sangam Award
  1986– Bharat Seva Ratna by World Religious Parliament
  1978– Included by Cambridge University in their Who's Who of Intellectuals for the year.

Philanthropy

Apart from her massive contribution in the education sector, Dayawati Modi was instrumental in catering to women and children's issues in the mid-1950s. In 1954, she founded the Samaj Kalyan Parishad at Modinagar, which provided welfare services to women and children. The institution was at the forefront of uplifting the underprivileged by giving them access to education, vocational training and other allied support services.   In honour of Dayawati Modi’s philanthropic contribution to society, her family instituted three awards: Dayawati Modi Kavi Shekhar Samman, the Dayawati Modi Award for Art, Culture and Education and the Dayawati Modi Stree Shakti Samman. High-profile recipients of the awards instituted by the Modi family since its inception include the Dalai Lama, Kent Walwin, and Amitabh Bachchan.

Since her death in 1994, the Dayawati Modi Foundation has carried on with the same altruistic principles, which governed Modi's life.

References

1915 births
1994 deaths
People from Kasganj
People from Modinagar
Dayawati
20th-century Indian philanthropists